His Honour Peter Edwin Lewis (8 December 1912 – 7 January 1976), was a British judge and Liberal Party politician.

Background
He was the son of Frederick Herbert Lewis. He was educated at Malvern College and University College, Oxford, where he took honours in Law  (BA, BCL). In 1948 he married Mary Ruth Massey. They had three sons and one daughter.

Professional career
In 1937 he was called to the Bar by the Inner Temple and practised as a barrister. From 1940-47 he served with the Intelligence branch of the Royal Air Force. In 1972 he became a Circuit Judge on South Eastern Circuit.

Political career
He was Liberal candidate for the Epping division of Essex at the 1950 General Election. In a difficult election for the Liberal Party he finished third;

He did not stand for parliament again.

References

1912 births
1976 deaths
Liberal Party (UK) parliamentary candidates
Alumni of University College, Oxford